María Isabel Moreno Allue (Maribel Moreno) (born 2 January 1981) is a Spanish road bicycle racer from Ribes de Freser, Girona.

Doping
Moreno was due to compete in the Women's road race at the 2008 Summer Olympics in Beijing on 10 August, but did not start having been tested positive for EPO. Moreno arrived in Beijing on 31 July and was immediately tested. She fled the country for Spain that same day, having suffered a panic attack. The positive test results were announced on 11 August, making Moreno the first athlete to test positive for a banned substance at the 2008 Olympic Games.

Palmarès

2001
1st GP Tolosa

2001
3rd Spanish National Road Race Championships

2002
1st GP Pavie

2003
3rd Spanish National Time Trial Championships
3rd European Time Trial Championships, U23
3rd European Road Race Championships, U23

2005
1st  Spanish National Road Race Championships
3rd Spanish National Time Trial Championships
2nd Stage 3a, Tour Féminin en Limousin, Chaptelat
3rd GP International Féminin 'Les Forges'

2006
1st  Spanish National Road Race Championships
2nd Spanish National Time Trial Championships

2007
1st  Spanish National Road Race Championships
1st  Spanish National Time Trial Championships
3rd Giro d'Italia Femminile
2nd Stage 3, Giro d'Italia Femminile, Prato a Calc
1st Tour de l'Ardèche
1st Stage 2, Tour de l'Ardèche, de Vals les Bains
2nd Stage 4, Tour de l'Ardèche, Privas
2nd Stage 5, Tour de l'Ardèche, Villeneuve de Berg

2008
2nd Trofeo Cantimpalos

See also
List of doping cases in cycling

References

External links

1981 births
Living people
Spanish female cyclists
Cyclists at the 2008 Summer Olympics
Doping cases in cycling
Spanish sportspeople in doping cases
Olympic cyclists of Spain
People from Ripollès
Sportspeople from the Province of Girona
Cyclists from Catalonia
21st-century Spanish women